Nyctegretis triangulella is a species of snout moth. It is found in Italy, Austria, the Czech Republic, Slovakia, Hungary, Romania and Greece.

The wingspan is 14–17 mm.

References

Moths described in 1901
Phycitini
Moths of Japan
Moths of Europe
Moths of Asia